King Size! is a jazz album by pianist and composer André Previn recorded in 1958 and released on the Contemporary label.

Reception
The AllMusic review by Scott Yanow states "This fine release gives one an excellent example of Previn's skills as a jazz pianist". On All About Jazz Dave Rickerts states "King Size is one of the few Previn albums not based around a musical or composer and thus lacks a little bit in focus. ...it takes confident and hardy souls to stretch tracks out to the nine minute mark in a trio setting as they do... Pleasant enough, but not as arresting as Previn's other work".

Track listing
All compositions by André Previn, except as indicated
 "I'll Remember April" (Gene de Paul, Patricia Johnston, Don Raye) - 6:24
 "Much Too Late" - 9:26
 "You'd Be So Nice to Come Home To" (Cole Porter) - 6:59
 "It Could Happen to You" (Jimmy Van Heusen, Johnny Burke) - 5:52
 "Low and Inside" - 8:57
 "I'm Beginning to See the Light" (Duke Ellington, Don George, Johnny Hodges, Harry James) - 8:00

Personnel
André Previn's Trio Jazz
André Previn - piano
Red Mitchell - bass
Frankie Capp - drums

References

1959 albums
Contemporary Records albums
André Previn albums